The 1996 Sybase Open was a men's tennis tournament played on indoor hard courts at the San Jose Arena in San Jose, California in the United States and was part of the World Series of the 1996 ATP Tour. The tournament ran from February 12 through February 18, 1996. Second-seeded Pete Sampras won the singles title.

Finals

Singles

 Pete Sampras defeated  Andre Agassi 6–2, 6–3
 It was Sampras' 1st title of the year and the 39th of his career.

Doubles

 Trevor Kronemann /  David Macpherson defeated  Richey Reneberg /  Jonathan Stark 6–4, 3–6, 6–3
 It was Kronemann's 1st title of the year and the 6th of his career. It was Macpherson's 1st title of the year and the 12th of his career.

See also
 Agassi–Sampras rivalry

References

External links
 ITF tournament edition details

Sybase Open
SAP Open
1996 in American tennis
Sybase Open
Sybase Open